Vice Admiral Kenneth Lloyd Dyer DSC, CD (7 November 1915 – 9 October 2000) was a senior officer in the Royal Canadian Navy during the Cuban Missile Crisis.

Naval career
Dyer joined the Royal Canadian Navy as a cadet on 1 October 1933. He served in the Second World War in command of the destroyer  and then the destroyer . He later commanded the aircraft carrier  from 1951 to 1953. He went on to be Assistant Chief of Naval Staff (Warfare) in 1956, Chief of Naval Personnel in 1957 and Flag Officer Atlantic Coast in 1960. In the latter role he put his fleet on alert during the Cuban Missile Crisis. His last role was as Principal Naval Adviser from 1964 to 1966.

Awards and decorations
Dyer's personal awards and decorations include the following:

120px

120px

120px

References

Canadian admirals
Canadian recipients of the Distinguished Service Cross (United Kingdom)
Canadian military personnel of World War II
1915 births
2000 deaths